Glyphostoma rugosum is a species of sea snail, a marine gastropod mollusk in the family Clathurellidae.

Description
The outer lip is thickened and toothed. The anal sinus is large and rather deep. The color of the shell is whitish, with a chestnut band at the suture, obscurely indicated on the middle of the body whorl. The length of the shell is 6.5 mm.

Distribution
This species occurs in the Pacific Ocean along Madagascar.

References

 Dautzenberg, Ph. (1929). Mollusques testacés marins de Madagascar. Faune des Colonies Francaises, Tome III

rugosum